Christopher Mark Tolley is a retired first-class cricketer who played for Worcestershire and Nottinghamshire. In 2002 Tolley was appointed County Academy Director for Nottinghamshire.

External links
Cricinfo profile

1967 births
Living people
English cricketers
Nottinghamshire cricketers
Worcestershire cricketers
Nottinghamshire Cricket Board cricketers
British Universities cricketers